Black rifle may refer to:

 ArmaLite AR-15
 Black Rifle Coffee Company
 Colt AR-15
 M16 rifle
 Modern sporting rifle